Zsuzsa Nagy (born 3 November 1975) is a Hungarian judoka. She competed in the women's half-middleweight event at the 1992 Summer Olympics.

References

External links
 

1975 births
Living people
Hungarian female judoka
Olympic judoka of Hungary
Judoka at the 1992 Summer Olympics
Sportspeople from Budapest